Riccardo Filippelli (born 4 July 1980) is an Italian sport shooter, who participated at the 2018 ISSF World Shooting Championships, winning a medal.

Achievements

References

External links
 

Living people
1980 births
Italian male sport shooters
Skeet shooters
Shooters at the 2019 European Games
European Games medalists in shooting
European Games silver medalists for Italy
Shooters of Centro Sportivo Carabinieri
Shooters of Gruppo Sportivo Esercito
21st-century Italian people